Tamarang Shire is a former local government area in New South Wales, Australia.

There were several villages, but no significant towns, in the shire.

It was merged with Quirindi Municipality in 1981 to form Quirindi Shire,  which was subsequently merged with parts of several other shires to form Liverpool Plains Shire, in 2004.

Former local government areas of New South Wales
1981 disestablishments in Australia